The women's volleyball tournament at the 2002 Asian Games was held from Wednesday October 2 to Saturday October 12, 2002 in Busan, South Korea. The women's volleyball event was contested for the 11th time at the Asian Games.

Squads

Results
All times are Korea Standard Time (UTC+09:00)

Preliminary round

|}

Final

|}

Final standing

References

 Results

External links
Official website

Women